Richard Dugas Jr. (born April 4, 1965 in Lafayette, Louisiana) was the chief executive officer of PulteGroup between 2003 and 2017.

Early life and education
Dugas received a Bachelor of Science from Louisiana State University in 1986.

Career
Dugas worked for Exxon and then Pepsi.

He then joined PulteGroup, based in Atlanta. After a few years, he was promoted to chief operating officer. In 2003, he became chief executive officer and in 2009, he was named chairman. He retired effective in May 2017.

In 2016, PulteGroup founder Bill Pulte said that "naming Dugas chief executive was ‘perhaps the biggest mistake of my career’".

References

American chief executives
Home builders
1965 births
Living people